Chryseobacterium hispanicum  is a bacterium from the genus of Chryseobacterium which has been isolated from a drinking water distribution system in Sevilla in Spain.

References

Further reading

External links
Type strain of Chryseobacterium hispanicum at BacDive -  the Bacterial Diversity Metadatabase

hispanicum
Bacteria described in 2006